Peter Burr is a digital and new media artist based in Brooklyn, New York, born August 3, 1980. Having received a BFA from Carnegie Mellon University in 2002, Peter specializes in animation and installation. He has been awarded a Guggenheim Fellowship, a Sundance New Frontier Story Lab Fellowship, a Creative Capital Award, and film/video prizes at the International Film Festival Rotterdam in 2016, among others. His work has been exhibited at The Zabludowicz Collection, The Institute for Contemporary Art, Richmond, 3-Legged Dog in New York, San Francisco Cinematheque's experimental festival CROSSROADS, Supernova Digital Animation Festival in Denver, Documenta 14 in Athens, and Centre Pompidou in Paris. He was also a touring member of the collective MOBILIVRE-BOOKMOBILE. In 2005, he founded the video label and touring animation roadshow Cartune Xprez. He was an artist-in-residence at MacDowell Colony and the Bemis Center for Contemporary Arts. In 2015, he was named one of the "best unrepresented artists."

Works 
Peter Burr's works gain inspiration from video game design. His project Special Effect is a live cinema performance that was presented at 50 different venues across the world from 2012 to 2014. Cave Exits (2015) is an art installation described as a living structure inside a 4-channel video cube. The work premiered at the Images Festival in Toronto in 2015. He continued that collaboration with an interactive artwork entitled Dirtscraper that premiered at the inaugural exhibition of the ICA at VCU. The project employs the "video game concept of an endlessly mutating death labyrinth," exploring themes of alienated feminine bodies and feral architecture.

Peter and Porpentine were commissioned by Rhizome to produce a Virtual Reality piece. Their project, Arcology, was a "portrait of a woman navigating a living labyrinth."

In May 2018, Peter's ongoing work Pattern Language was exhibited at Times Square as the monthly installment of the Midnight Moments series. The display involved digital art on advertising screens.

Selected works 
 Dirtscraper (2018)
Pattern Language (2016)
The Mess (2016)
 Cave Exits (2015)
 Special Effect (2012)
 Green I Red (2012)
Alone With The Moon (2012)

Awards 
 Guggenheim Fellowship (2018)
Brooklyn Art Fund Grant (2017)
Creative Capital Award in Emerging Fields (2016)
 Sundance Institute's New Frontier Story Lab Fellowship (2016) 
 Supernova Digital Arts Festival Grand Prize (2016)
 25FPS International Experimental Film/Video Festival Critics Choice Award and Critics Jury Award (2016)
 NYFA Fellowship (2015)

References 

1980 births
American artists
Living people
Carnegie Mellon University alumni
Sarah Lawrence College faculty